The 1st Igo Masters Cup began on 24 February and ended on 23 July 2011. Eleven players participated: Kobayashi Koichi (Honorary Kisei, Meijin, and Gosei), Kudo Norio (Tengen 1997, Oza 1977), Rin Kaiho (Honorary Tengen), Kataoka Satoshi (Tengen 1982, 1983), Hane Yasumasa (Oza 1990), Ishida Yoshio (24th Honinbo), Takemiya Masaki (Meijin, Honinbo, and Judan), Cho Chikun (25th Honinbo, Honorary Meijin), O Rissei (Kisei, Judan, and Oza), Kobayashi Satoru (Kisei, Gosei 1995), Otake Hideo (Honorary Gosei).

Kobayashi Koichi, Ishida Yoshio, Takemiya Masaki, Cho Chikun, and Otake Hideo were given first round byes.

Tournament

References

2011 in go
Go competitions in Japan